Hanlan is a surname. Notable people with the surname include: 

Brandon Hanlan (born 1997), English footballer
Lee Hanlan (born 1971), English rugby league player
Ned Hanlan (1855–1908), Canadian sculler, hotelier, and alderman
Olivier Hanlan (born 1993), Canadian basketball player